Ranheim Church is a parish church of the Church of Norway in Trondheim municipality in Trøndelag county, Norway. It is located in the village of Ranheim, east of the city of Trondheim. It is one of the churches for the Ranheim og Charlottenlund parish which is part of the Strinda prosti (deanery) in the Diocese of Nidaros. The white, stone church was built in a cruciform style using plans drawn up by the architect Roar Tønseth (1895-1985). The church seats about 200 people.

History
The first chapel in Ranheim was a wooden long church built in 1898 using designs by the architect Karl Norum. The chapel was consecrated on 20 April 1898 and it seated about 350 people. The church was struck by lightning shortly before midnight on 25 January 1932 and the church caught fire and burned to the ground in about an hour. Some of the altar equipment, the priestly garments, and some of the furniture from the sacristy were able to be saved. A new church was built in 1933 that was consecrated on 20 April 1933 by the Bishop Johan Nicolai Støren. The new church is a cruciform design with very short transepts. The church was renovated in 2013.

Media gallery

See also
List of churches in Nidaros

References

Churches in Trondheim
Churches in Trøndelag
Cruciform churches in Norway
Stone churches in Norway
20th-century Church of Norway church buildings
Churches completed in 1933
1898 establishments in Norway